The 2016 BBC Sports Personality of the Year Award took place on 18 December 2016 at the Genting Arena in Birmingham. It was the 63rd presentation of the BBC Sports Personality of the Year Award. Awarded annually by the British Broadcasting Corporation (BBC), the main award honours an individual's British sporting achievement over the past year, with the winner selected by public vote from a sixteen-person shortlist; the winner was Tennis player Andy Murray, who became the first person to win the award three times.
The event, broadcast live on BBC One, was hosted by Gary Lineker, Clare Balding and Gabby Logan.

Nominees
The nominees were revealed on 28 November 2016, during BBC One's The One Show. To reflect the vast success of the past year, a record 16 sportspeople were named on the shortlist.

Other awards
In addition to the main award as "Sports Personality of the Year", several other awards were also announced:

Overseas Personality: Simone Biles
Team of the Year: Leicester City F.C.
Lifetime Achievement: Michael Phelps
Coach of the Year: Claudio Ranieri
Helen Rollason Award: Ben Smith
Young Personality: Ellie Robinson
Unsung Hero Award: Marcellus Baz

In Memoriam

Johan Cruyff
Don Howe Gary Sprake Sylvia Gore
Stacey Burrows Lucy Pygott
Dr John Aldridge Mitch Fenner
Roger Millward Mick Sullivan
Denys Smith Thomas Cusack
Malachi Mitchell-Thomas Billy Redmayne
Tony Mottram JJ Warr
Hannah Francis Karen Lewis-Archer Sarah Young
Roddy Evans Grahame Hodgson
Ken Higgs Hanif Mohammad Ruth Prideaux
Beryl Crockford Ailish Sheehan Sarah Tait
Gerald Williams Dave Lanning
Dickie Jeeps Seb Adeniran-Olule
Anthony Foley
Arnold Palmer
Christy O'Connor Jnr Christy O'Connor Snr
John Disley Dave Cropper Anne Pashley
Frans ten Bos Alastair Biggar
Jack Bannister Martin Crowe
Ronan Costello Harry Jepson
Pavel Srnicek Cesare Maldini
Alan Henry Bob Cass
Dalian Atkinson Phil Gartside
Walter Swinburn
Carlos Alberto
Walter McGowan Mike Towell Freddie Gilroy
Tony Cozier Bud Collins
Isabelle Docherty Martin Barker
Meadowlark Lemon Bill Johnson Bahman Golbarnezhad
Mark Farren Zoe Tynan
Victims of the Chapecoense air disaster

References

External links
Official website

Bbc
BBC Sports Personality of the Year Award
BBC Sports Personality of the Year Award
Bbc
2010s in Birmingham, West Midlands
BBC Sports Personality of the Year awards
BBC Sports Personality of the Year Award